The 8th Daytime Emmy Awards were held on Thursday, May 21, 1981, to commemorate excellence in daytime programming from March 6, 1980 to March 5, 1981. The eighth awards did not include the cameo category from the previous year, so only five awards were given, like in previous years.

The ceremony was telecast from 3 to 4:30 p.m. on ABC, preempting General Hospital and The Edge of Night.

Winners in each category are in bold.

Outstanding Daytime Drama Series
All My Children
General Hospital
Ryan's Hope

Outstanding Actor in a Daytime Drama Series
James Mitchell (Palmer Cortlandt, All My Children)
Douglass Watson (Mac Cory, Another World)
Larry Bryggman (John Dixon, As the World Turns)
Henderson Forsythe (David Stewart, As the World Turns)
Anthony Geary (Luke Spencer, General Hospital)

Outstanding Actress in a Daytime Drama Series
Julia Barr (Brooke English, All My Children)
Susan Lucci (Erica Kane, All My Children)
Judith Light (Karen Wolek, One Life to Live)
Robin Strasser (Dorian Lord, One Life to Live)
Helen Gallagher (Maeve Ryan, Ryan's Hope)

Outstanding Supporting Actor in a Daytime Drama Series
Matthew Cowles (Billy Clyde Tuggle, All My Children)
William Mooney (Paul Martin, All My Children)
Justin Deas (Tom Hughes, As the World Turns)
Richard Backus (Barry Ryan, Ryan's Hope)
Larry Haines (Stu Bergman, Search for Tomorrow)

Outstanding Supporting Actress in a Daytime Drama Series
Elizabeth Lawrence, (Myra Sloane, All My Children)
Lois Kibbee, (Geraldine Whitney Saxon, The Edge of Night)
Jane Elliot (Tracy Quartermaine, General Hospital)
Randall Edwards (Delia Ryan, Ryan's Hope)
Jacklyn Zeman (Bobbie Spencer, General Hospital)

Outstanding Daytime Drama Series Writing
 Guiding Light: Douglas Marland, Robert Dwywer, Nancy Franklin & Harding Lemay All My Children: Agnes Nixon, Wisner Washam, Jack Wood
 General Hospital
 One Life to Live

Outstanding Daytime Drama Series Directing
 All My Children
 General Hospital
 One Life to Live

Outstanding Game Show
The $20,000 Pyramid – A Bob Stewart Production for ABC
Family Feud – A Mark Goodson-Bill Todman Production for ABC
The Hollywood Squares – A Heatter-Quigley Production for NBC

Outstanding Game Show Host
Peter Marshall (The Hollywood Squares)
Dick Clark (The $20,000 Pyramid)
Richard Dawson (Family Feud)

References

008
D